The Falco Xplorer is a MALE UAV developed by Leonardo S.p.A. of Italy. Aimed at military and civilian markets, the drone is not subject to ITAR restrictions making it easily exportable around the world.

References

Medium-altitude long-endurance unmanned aerial vehicles
Leonardo S.p.A.
Unmanned aerial vehicles of Italy